A total solar eclipse occurred on August 31, 1932. A solar eclipse occurs when the Moon passes between Earth and the Sun, thereby totally or partly obscuring the image of the Sun for a viewer on Earth. A total solar eclipse occurs when the Moon's apparent diameter is larger than the Sun's, blocking all direct sunlight, turning day into darkness. Totality occurs in a narrow path across Earth's surface, with the partial solar eclipse visible over a surrounding region thousands of kilometres wide. Totality was visible from Northwest Territories (today's Northwest Territories and Nunavut) and Quebec in Canada, and northeastern Vermont, New Hampshire, southwestern Maine, northeastern tip of Massachusetts and northeastern Cape Cod in the United States.

Related eclipses

Solar eclipses 1931–1935

Saros 124

Inex series 

In the 19th century:

 Solar Saros 120: Total Solar Eclipse of 1816 Nov 19

 Solar Saros 121: Hybrid Solar Eclipse of 1845 Oct 30

 Solar Saros 122: Annular Solar Eclipse of 1874 Oct 10

In the 22nd century:

 Solar Saros 130: Total Solar Eclipse of 2106 May 03

 Solar Saros 131: Annular Solar Eclipse of 2135 Apr 13

 Solar Saros 132: Hybrid Solar Eclipse of 2164 Mar 23

 Solar Saros 133: Total Solar Eclipse of 2193 Mar 03

Metonic series

Notes

References 

1932 08 31
1932 08 31
1932 in science
August 1932 events